The Kalayaan Hall (Filipino: Bulwagang Kalayaan) is a government building within the Malacañang Palace complex in Manila, Philippines. It houses the Presidential Museum and Library.

History

As the Executive Building
The Kalayaan Hall was built as the Executive Building by Governor General Francis Burton Harrison in from 1920 to 1921 during the American colonial era. It was first fully used by Harrison's successor Leonard Wood. Philippine President Manuel L. Quezon took office in the building in 1935. In 1937, the building's second floor was renovated to accommodate offices of the President, Vice President, the Council of State and the Cabinet. The building would serve as the principal official building of the Malacañang Palace by the succeeding presidents after Quezon until Ramon Magsaysay.

President Elpidio Quirino and Carlos P. Garcia took their oath as president in the Executive Building; on April 17, 1948 and March 18, 1957 respectively. Presidents Garcia and Diosdado Macapagal rarely used the Executive Building for official functions; instead using the Malacañang Palace proper.

As the Maharlika Hall
In the 1970s, during the administration of President Ferdinand Marcos and under the initiative of his wife and First Lady Imelda Marcos, the central portion of the second floor of the building was demolish to make way for a large room; the room and the building itself was then renamed as Maharlika Hall. It was also in the building's largest room where Marcos formally proclaimed Martial Law over the Philippines on September 23, 1972. In 1986 Marcos was last seen in the building's balcony after his inauguration. Before he and his family were forced to flee from the palace.

As the Kalayaan Hall
After the People Power Revolution of 1986 which deposed Marcos and installed Corazon Aquino as president, the Maharlika Hall was renamed as the Kalayaan Hall by Aquino's administration as commemoration of the revolution.

The Kalayaan Hall was then used as Office of the Press Secretary until 2002 when it was made the main gallery of the Presidential Museum and Library.

Architecture and design
The Kalayaan Hall is described as an example of Renaissance–Revivalist architecture.
The building was constructed by the Bureau of Public Works with involvement of American consulting architect Ralph Harrington Doane and supervision of Filipino architect Tomas Mapua. The building's pre-cast ornamentation and carved wooden interiors were made by sculptors  Isabelo Tampinco and Graciano Nepomuceno.

The 1930s expansion was overseen by Juan Arellano and Vidal Tampinco. Arellano was responsible for the exterior and Tampinco for the interior.

References

National Historical Landmarks of the Philippines
Government buildings completed in 1921
Malacañang Palace
Buildings and structures in Manila